Xietang Station is a station of Line 5, Suzhou Rail Transit. The station is located in Suzhou Industrial Park, Jiangsu. It has been in use since June 29, 2021; when Line 5 first opened to the public. Upon completion of Line 8, expected September 2024, the station will act as one of 3 interchanged between the lines.

References 

Railway stations in Jiangsu
Suzhou Rail Transit stations
Railway stations in China opened in 2021